Coenwalh is an Anglo-Saxon name that can refer to either:

 Cenwalh of Wessex
 Coenwalh (Bishop of London)

Old English given names